Carex paniculata, the greater tussock-sedge, is a species of flowering plant in the sedge family, Cyperaceae.

References

External links

paniculata
Flora of Asia
Flora of Europe
Flora of North America
Plants described in 1755
Taxa named by Carl Linnaeus